Language education – the process and practice of teaching a second or foreign language – is primarily a branch of applied linguistics, but can be an interdisciplinary field. There are four main learning categories for language education: communicative competencies, proficiencies, cross-cultural experiences, and multiple literacies.

Need
Increasing globalization has created a great need for people in the workforce who can communicate in multiple languages. Common languages are used in areas such as trade, tourism, diplomacy, technology, media, translation, interpretation and science. Many countries such as Korea (Kim Yeong-seo, 2009), Japan (Kubota, 1998) and China (Kirkpatrick & Zhichang, 2002) frame education policies to teach at least one foreign language at the primary and secondary school levels. However, some countries such as India, Singapore, Malaysia, Pakistan, and the Philippines use a second official language in their governments. According to GAO (2010), China has recently been putting enormous importance on foreign language learning, especially the English language.

History

Ancient to medieval period
Although the need to learn foreign languages is almost as old as human history itself, the origins of modern language education are in the study and teaching of Latin in the 17th century. In the Ancient Near East, Akkadian was the language of diplomacy, as in the Amarna letters. For many centuries, Latin had been the dominant language of education, commerce, religion, and government in much of the Western world. By the end of the 16th century, it had largely been displaced by French, Italian, and English. John Amos Comenius was one of many people who tried to reverse this trend. He composed a complete course for learning Latin, covering the entire school curriculum, culminating in his Opera Didactica Omnia, 1657.

In this work, Comenius also outlined his theory of language acquisition. He is one of the first theorists to write  systematically about how languages are learned and about pedagogical methodology for language acquisition. He held that language acquisition must be allied with sensation and experience. Teaching must be oral. The schoolroom should have models of things, and failing that, pictures of them. As a result, he also published the world's first illustrated children's book, Orbis sensualium pictus. The study of Latin diminished from the study of a living language to be used in the real world to a subject in the school curriculum. Such decline brought about a new justification for its study. It was then claimed that its study of Latin developed intellectual ability, and the study of Latin grammar became an end in and of itself.

"Grammar schools" from the 16th to 18th centuries focused on teaching the grammatical aspects of Classical Latin. Advanced students continued grammar study with the addition of rhetoric.

18th century
The study of modern languages did not become part of the curriculum of European schools until the 18th century. Based on the purely academic study of Latin, students of modern languages did much of the same exercises, studying grammatical rules and translating abstract sentences. Oral work was minimal, and students were instead required to memorize grammatical rules and apply these to decode written texts in the target language. This tradition-inspired method became known as the grammar-translation method.

19th and 20th centuries

Innovation in foreign language teaching began in the 19th century and became very rapid in the 20th century. It led to a number of different and sometimes conflicting methods, each claiming to be a major improvement over the previous or contemporary methods. The earliest applied linguists included Jean Manes ca, Heinrich Gottfried Ollendorff (1803–1865), Henry Sweet (1845–1912), Otto Jespersen (1860–1943), and Harold Palmer (1877–1949). They worked on setting language teaching principles and approaches based on linguistic and psychological theories, but they left many of the specific practical details for others to devise.

The history of foreign-language education in the 20th century and the methods of teaching (such as those related below) might appear to be a history of failure. Very few students in U.S. universities who have a foreign language as a major attain "minimum professional proficiency". Even the "reading knowledge" required for a PhD degree is comparable only to what second-year language students read, and only very few researchers who are native English speakers can read and assess information written in languages other than English. Even a number of famous linguists are monolingual.

However, anecdotal evidence for successful second or foreign language learning is easy to find, leading to a discrepancy between these cases and the failure of most language programs. This tends to make the research of second-language acquisition emotionally charged. Older methods and approaches such as the grammar translation method and the direct method are dismissed and even ridiculed, as newer methods and approaches are invented and promoted as the only and complete solution to the problem of the high failure rates of foreign language students.

Most books on language teaching list the various methods that have been used in the past, often ending with the author's new method. These new methods are usually presented as coming only from the author's mind, as the authors generally give no credence to what was done before and do not explain how it relates to the new method. For example, descriptive linguists seem to claim unhesitatingly that there were no scientifically based language teaching methods before their work (which led to the audio-lingual method developed for the U.S. Army in World War II). However, there is significant evidence to the contrary. It is also often inferred or even stated that older methods were completely ineffective or have died out completely, though in reality, even the oldest methods are still in use (e.g. the Berlitz version of the direct method). Proponents of new methods have been so sure that their ideas are so new and so correct that they could not conceive that the older ones have enough validity to cause controversy. This was in turn caused by emphasis on new scientific advances, which has tended to blind researchers to precedents in older work.(p. 5)

There have been two major branches in the field of language learning, the empirical and theoretical, and these have almost completely separate histories, with each gaining ground over the other at one time or another. Examples of researchers on the empiricist side are Jesperson, Palmer, and Leonard Bloomfield, who promote mimicry and memorization with pattern drills. These methods follow from the basic empiricist position that language acquisition results from habits formed by conditioning and drilling. In its most extreme form, language learning is seen as much the same as any other learning in any other species, human language being essentially the same as communication behaviors seen in other species.

On the theoretical side are, for example, Francois Gouin, M.D. Berlitz, and Emile B. De Sauzé, whose rationalist theories of language acquisition dovetail with linguistic work done by Noam Chomsky and others. These have led to a wider variety of teaching methods, ranging from the grammar-translation method and Gouin's "series method" to the direct methods of Berlitz and De Sauzé. With these methods, students generate original and meaningful sentences to gain a functional knowledge of the rules of grammar. This follows from the rationalist position that man is born to think and that language use is a uniquely human trait impossible in other species. Given that human languages share many common traits, the idea is that humans share a universal grammar which is built into our brain structure. This allows us to create sentences that we have never heard before but that can still be immediately understood by anyone who understands the specific language being spoken. The rivalry between the two camps is intense, with little communication or cooperation between them.

21st century
Over time, language education has developed in schools and has become a part of the education curriculum around the world. In some countries, such as the United States, language education (also referred to as World Languages) has become a core subject along with main subjects such as English, Maths and Science.

In some countries, such as Australia, it is so common nowadays for a foreign language to be taught in schools that the subject of language education is referred to LOTE or Language Other Than English. In the majority of English-speaking education centers, French, Spanish, and German are the most popular languages to study and learn. English as a Second Language (ESL) is also available for students whose first language is not English and they are unable to speak it to the required standard.

Teaching foreign language in classrooms

Language education may take place as a general school subject or in a specialized language school. There are many methods of teaching languages. Some have fallen into relative obscurity and others are widely used; still others have a small following, but offer useful insights.

While sometimes confused, the terms "approach", "method" and "technique" are hierarchical concepts.

An approach is a set of assumptions about the nature of language and language learning, but does not involve procedure or provide any details about how such assumptions should be implemented into the classroom setting. Such can be related to second-language acquisition theory.

There are three principal "approaches":
 The structural view treats language as a system of structurally related elements to code meaning (e.g. grammar).
 The functional view sees language as a vehicle to express or accomplish a certain function, such as requesting something.
 The interactive view sees language as a vehicle for the creation and maintenance of social relations, focusing on patterns of moves, acts, negotiation and interaction found in conversational exchanges. This approach has been fairly dominant since the 1980s.

A method is a plan for presenting the language material to be learned, and should be based upon a selected approach. In order for an approach to be translated into a method, an instructional system must be designed considering the objectives of the teaching/learning, how the content is to be selected and organized, the types of tasks to be performed, the roles of students, and the roles of teachers.
 Examples of structural methods are grammar translation and the audio-lingual method.
 Examples of functional methods include the oral approach / situational language teaching.
 Examples of interactive methods include the direct method, the series method, communicative language teaching, language immersion, the Silent Way, Suggestopedia, the Natural Approach, Tandem Language Learning, Total Physical Response, Teaching Proficiency through Reading and Storytelling and Dogme language teaching.

A technique (or strategy) is a very specific, concrete stratagem or trick designed to accomplish an immediate objective. Such are derived from the controlling method, and less directly, from the approach.

Online and self-study courses
Hundreds of languages are available for self-study, from scores of publishers, for a range of costs, using a variety of methods. The course itself acts as a teacher and has to choose a methodology, just as classroom teachers do.

Audio recordings and books
Audio recordings use native speakers, and one strength is helping learners improve their accent. Some recordings have pauses for the learner to speak. Others are continuous so the learner speaks along with the recorded voice, similar to learning a song.

Audio recordings for self-study use many of the methods used in classroom teaching, and have been produced on records, tapes, CDs, DVDs and websites.

Most audio recordings teach words in the target language by using explanations in the learner's own language. An alternative is to use sound effects to show meaning of words in the target language. The only language in such recordings is the target language, and they are comprehensible regardless of the learner's native language.

Language books have been published for centuries, teaching vocabulary and grammar. The simplest books are phrasebooks to give useful short phrases for travelers, cooks, receptionists, or others who need specific vocabulary. More complete books include more vocabulary, grammar, exercises, translation, and writing practice.

Also, various other "language learning tools" have been entering the market in recent years.

Internet and software
Software can interact with learners in ways that books and audio cannot:

 Some software records the learner, analyzes the pronunciation, and gives feedback.
 Software can present additional exercises in areas where a particular learner has difficulty, until the concepts are mastered.
 Software can pronounce words in the target language and show their meaning by using pictures instead of oral explanations. The only language in such software is the target language. It is comprehensible regardless of the learner's native language.

Websites provide various services geared toward language education. Some sites are designed specifically for learning languages:

 Some software runs on the web itself, with the advantage of avoiding downloads, and the disadvantage of requiring an internet connection.
 Some publishers use the web to distribute audio, texts and software, for use offline. For example, various travel guides, for example Lonely Planet, offer software supporting language education.
 Some websites offer learning activities such as quizzes or puzzles to practice language concepts.
 Language exchange sites connect users with complementary language skills, such as a native Spanish speaker who wants to learn English with a native English speaker who wants to learn Spanish. Language exchange websites essentially treat knowledge of a language as a commodity, and provide a marketlike environment for the commodity to be exchanged. Users typically contact each other via chat, VoIP, or email. Language exchanges have also been viewed as a helpful tool to aid language learning at language schools. Language exchanges tend to benefit oral proficiency, fluency, colloquial vocabulary acquisition, and vernacular usage, rather than formal grammar or writing skills. Across Australasia, 'Education Perfect' – an online learning site- is frequently used as it enables teachers to monitor students' progress as students gain a "point" for every new word remembered. There is an annual international Education Perfect languages contest held in May.

Many other websites are helpful for learning languages, even though they are designed, maintained and marketed for other purposes:

 All countries have websites in their own languages, which learners elsewhere can use as primary material for study: news, fiction, videos, songs, etc. In a study conducted by the Center for Applied Linguistics, it was noted that the use of technology and media has begun to play a heavy role in facilitating language learning in the classroom. With the help of the internet, students are readily exposed to foreign media (music videos, television shows, films) and as a result, teachers are taking heed of the internet's influence and are searching for ways to combine this exposure into their classroom teaching.
 Translation sites let learners find the meaning of foreign text or create foreign translations of text from their native language.
 Speech synthesis or text to speech (TTS) sites and software let learners hear pronunciation of arbitrary written text, with pronunciation similar to a native speaker.
 Course development and learning management systems such as Moodle are used by teachers, including language teachers.
 Web conferencing tools can bring remote learners together; e.g. Elluminate Live.
 Players of computer games can practice a target language when interacting in massively multiplayer online games and virtual worlds. In 2005, the virtual world Second Life started to be used for foreign language tuition, sometimes with entire businesses being developed. In addition, Spain's language and cultural institute Instituto Cervantes has an "island" on Second Life.
Some Internet content is free, often from government and nonprofit sites such as BBC Online, Book2, Foreign Service Institute, with no or minimal ads. Some are ad-supported, such as newspapers and YouTube. Some require a payment.

Learning strategies
Language learning strategies have attracted increasing focus as a way of understanding the process of language acquisition.

Listening as a way to learn
Clearly listening is used to learn, but not all language learners employ it consciously. Listening to understand is one level of listening but focused listening is not something that most learners employ as a strategy. Focused listening is a strategy in listening that helps students listen attentively with no distractions. Focused listening is very important when learning a foreign language as the slightest accent on a word can change the meaning completely.

Reading as a way to learn
Many people read to understand but the strategy of reading text to learn grammar and discourse styles can also be employed. Parallel texts may be used to improve comprehension.

Speaking as a way to learn
Alongside listening and reading exercises, practicing conversation skills is an important aspect of language acquisition. Language learners can gain experience in speaking foreign languages through in-person language classes, language meet-ups, university language exchange programs, joining online language learning communities, and traveling to a country where the language is spoken.

Learning vocabulary
Translation and rote memorization have been the two strategies that have been employed traditionally. There are other strategies that also can be used such as guessing, based on looking for contextual clues, spaced repetition with a use of various apps, games and tools (e.g. Duolingo and Anki). Knowledge about how the brain works can be utilized in creating strategies for how to remember words.

Learning Esperanto as a propaedeutic strategy for learning other languages
and

Esperanto, the most widely used international auxiliary language, was founded by L. L. Zamenhof, a Polish-Jewish ophthalmologist, in 1887, aimed to eliminate language barriers in the international contacts. Esperanto is an artificial language created on the basis of the Indo-European languages, absorbing the reasonable factors of commonality of the Germanic languages. Esperanto is completely consistent in its speech and writing. By learning twenty-eight letters and mastering the phonetic rules, one can read and write any words. With further simplification and standardization, Esperanto becomes more easily mastered than other languages. Ease of learning helps one build the confidence and learning Esperanto, as a learning strategy, constitutes a good introduction to foreign language study.

Teaching strategies

Blended learning

Blended learning combines face-to-face teaching with distance education, frequently electronic, either computer-based or web-based. It has been a major growth point in the ELT (English Language Teaching) industry over the last ten years. 

Some people, though, use the phrase 'Blended Learning' to refer to learning taking place while the focus is on other activities. For example, playing a card game that requires calling for cards may allow blended learning of numbers (1 to 10).

Skill teaching
When talking about language skills, the four basic ones are: listening, speaking, reading and writing. However, other, more socially based skills have been identified more recently such as summarizing, describing, narrating etc. In addition, more general learning skills such as study skills and knowing how one learns have been applied to language classrooms.

In the 1970s and 1980s, the four basic skills were generally taught in isolation in a very rigid order, such as listening before speaking. However, since then, it has been recognized that we generally use more than one skill at a time, leading to more integrated exercises. Speaking is a skill that often is underrepresented in the traditional classroom. This is due to the fact that it is considered harder to teach and test. There are numerous texts on teaching and testing writing but relatively few on speaking.

More recent textbooks stress the importance of students working with other students in pairs and groups, sometimes the entire class. Pair and group work give opportunities for more students to participate more actively. However, supervision of pairs and groups is important to make sure everyone participates as equally as possible. Such activities also provide opportunities for peer teaching, where weaker learners can find support from stronger classmates.

Sandwich technique

In foreign language teaching, the sandwich technique is the oral insertion of an idiomatic translation in the mother tongue between an unknown phrase in the learned language and its repetition, in order to convey meaning as rapidly and completely as possible. The mother tongue equivalent can be given almost as an aside, with a slight break in the flow of speech to mark it as an intruder.

When modeling a dialogue sentence for students to repeat, the teacher not only gives an oral mother tongue equivalent for unknown words or phrases, but repeats the foreign language phrase before students imitate it: L2 => L1 => L2. For example, a German teacher of English might engage in the following exchange with the students:

 Teacher: "Let me try – lass mich versuchen – let me try."
 Students: "Let me try."

Mother tongue mirroring

Mother tongue mirroring is the adaptation of the time-honoured technique of literal translation or word-for word translation for pedagogical purposes. The aim is to make foreign constructions salient and transparent to learners and, in many cases, spare them the technical jargon of grammatical analysis. It differs from literal translation and interlinear text as used in the past since it takes the progress learners have made into account and only focuses upon a specific structure at a time. As a didactic device, it can only be used to the extent that it remains intelligible to the learner, unless it is combined with a normal idiomatic translation. This technique is seldom referred to or used these days.

Back-chaining

Back-chaining is a technique used in teaching oral language skills, especially with polysyllabic or difficult words. The teacher pronounces the last syllable, the student repeats, and then the teacher continues, working backwards from the end of the word to the beginning.

For example, to teach the name ‘Mussorgsky' a teacher will pronounce the last syllable: -sky, and have the student repeat it. Then the teacher will repeat it with -sorg- attached before: -sorg-sky, and all that remains is the first syllable: Mus-sorg-sky.

Code switching

Code switching is a special linguistic phenomenon that the speaker consciously alternates two or more languages according to different time, places, contents, objects and other factors. Code switching shows its functions while one is in the environment that mother tongue are not playing a dominant role in students' life and study, such as the children in the bilingual family or in the immigrant family. That is to say, the capability of using code switching, relating to the transformation of phonetics, words, language structure, expression mode, thinking mode, cultural differences and so on, is needed to be guided and developed in the daily communication environment. Most people learn foreign language in the circumstance filled with the using of their native language so that their ability of code switching cannot be stimulated, and thus the efficiency of foreign language acquisition would decrease. Therefore, as a teaching strategy, code switching is used to help students better gain conceptual competences and to provide rich semantic context for them to understand some specific vocabularies.

By region

Practices in language education may vary by region however the underlying understandings which drive it are fundamentally similar. Rote repetition, drilling, memorisation and grammar conjugating are used the world over. Sometimes there are different preferences teaching methods by region. Language immersion is popular in some European countries, but is not used very much in the United States, in Asia or in Australia.

By different life stage

Early childhood education

Early childhood is the fastest and most critical period for one to master language in their life. Children's language communication is transformed from non-verbal communication to verbal communication from ages of one to five. Their mastery of language is largely acquired naturally by living in a verbal communication environment. As long as we are good at guiding and creating opportunities for children, children's language ability is easy to be developed and cultivated.

Compulsory education
Compulsory education, for most people, is the period that they have access to a second or foreign language for the first time. In this period, the most professional foreign language education and academic atmosphere are provided to the students. They can get help and motivation from teachers and be activated by the peers at any time. One would be able to undergo a lot of specialized learning in order to truly master a great number of rules of vocabulary, grammar and verbal communication.

Adult education

Learning a foreign language during adulthood means one is pursuing a higher value of themself by obtaining a new skill. At this stage, individuals have already developed the ability to supervise themself learning a language. However, at the same time, the pressure is also an obstacle for adults.

Elderly education
Compared to other life stages, this period is the hardest to learn a new language due to gradual brain deterioration and memory loss. Notwithstanding its difficulty, language education for seniors can slow this brain degeneration and active ageing.

Language study holidays

An increasing number of people are now combining holidays with language study in the native country. This enables the student to experience the target culture by meeting local people. Such a holiday often combines formal lessons, cultural excursions, leisure activities, and a homestay, perhaps with time to travel in the country afterwards. Language study holidays are popular across Europe (Malta & UK being the most popular) and Asia due to the ease of transportation and variety of nearby countries. These holidays have become increasingly more popular in Central and South America in such countries as Guatemala, Ecuador and Peru. As a consequence of this increasing popularity, several international language education agencies have flourished in recent years. Though education systems around the world invest enormous sums of money into language teaching the outcomes in terms of getting students to actually speak the language(s) they are learning outside the classroom are often unclear.

With the increasing prevalence of international business transactions, it is now important to have multiple languages at one's disposal. This is also evident in businesses outsourcing their departments to Eastern Europe.

Minority language education

Minority language education policy
The principal policy arguments in favor of promoting minority language education are the need for multilingual workforces, intellectual and cultural benefits and greater inclusion in global information society. Access to education in a minority language is also seen as a human right as granted by the European Convention on Human Rights and Fundamental Freedoms, the European Charter for Regional or Minority Languages and the UN Human Rights Committee. Bilingual Education has been implemented in many countries including the United States, in order to promote both the use and appreciation of the minority language, as well as the majority language concerned.

Materials and e-learning for minority language education
Suitable resources for teaching and learning minority languages can be difficult to find and access, which has led to calls for the increased development of materials for minority language teaching. The internet offers opportunities to access a wider range of texts, audios and videos. Language learning 2.0 (the use of web 2.0 tools for language education) offers opportunities for material development for lesser-taught languages and to bring together geographically dispersed teachers and learners.

Acronyms and abbreviations
ALL: Apprenticeship Language Learning
CALL: computer-assisted language learning
CLIL: content and language integrated learning
CELI: Certificato di Conoscenza della Lingua Italiana
CLL: community language learning
DELE: Diploma de Español como Lengua Extranjera
DELF: diplôme d'études en langue française
EFL: English as a foreign language
EAL/D: English as an additional language or dialect
EAP: English for academic purposes
ELL: English language learning
ELT: English language teaching
ESL: English as a second language
ESP: English for specific purposes English for specific purposes
FLL: foreign language learning
FLT: foreign language teaching
HLL: heritage language learning
IATEFL: International Association of Teachers of English as a Foreign Language  International Association of Teachers of English as a Foreign Language
L1: first language, native language, mother tongue
L2: second language (or any additional language)
LDL: Lernen durch Lehren (German for learning by teaching)
LOTE: Languages Other Than English
MFL: modern foreign languages
SLA: second-language acquisition
TELL: technology-enhanced language learning
TEFL: teaching English as a foreign language
TEFLA: teaching English as a foreign language to adults
TESOL: teaching English to speakers of other languages
TEYL: teaching English to young learners
TPR: Total Physical Response
TPRS: Teaching Proficiency through Reading and Storytelling
UNIcert is a European language education system of many universities based on the Common European Framework of Reference for Languages.
 See also English language learning and teaching for information on language teaching acronyms and abbreviations which are specific to English

See also 

American Council on the Teaching of Foreign Languages
Directorate of Language Planning and Implementation
Eikaiwa school
Error analysis (linguistics)
Foreign language anxiety
Foreign language writing aid
Foreign language reading aid
Glossary of language teaching terms and ideas
Language education by region
Language festival
Language MOOC
Language policy
Lexicography
Linguistic rights
List of language acquisition researchers
Monolingual learner's dictionary
Self access language learning centers
Tandem language learning

References

Sources 
Australian-Japanese relations today. (2016). Skwirk. Retrieved 16 May 2016, from http://www.skwirk.com/p-c_s-16_u-430_t-1103_c-4268/australian-japanese-relations-today/nsw/australian-japanese-relations-today/conflict-consensus-and-care/changing-attitudes
Parry, M. (2016). Australian university students and their Japanese host families in short term stays. The University of Queensland. Retrieved 16 May 2016, from https://espace.library.uq.edu.au/view/UQ:349330/s3213739_phd_submission.pdf
Pérez-Milans, M (2013). Urban schools and English language education in late modern China: A Critical sociolinguistic ethnography. New York & London: Routledge.
Gao, Xuesong (Andy). (2010).Strategic Language Learning.Multilingual Matters:Canada, 2010
Kim Yeong-seo (2009) "History of English education in Korea"
Kirkpatrick, A & Zhichang, X (2002).”Chinese pragmatic norms and "China English". World Englishes. Vol. 21, pp. 269–279.
Kubota, K (1998) "Ideologies of English in Japan" World Englishes Vol.17, No.3, pp. 295–306.
Phillips, J. K. (2007). Foreign Language Education: Whose Definition?. The Modern Language Journal, 91(2), 266–268.
American Council on the Teaching of Foreign Languages (2011). Language Learning in the 21st Century: 21st Century Skills Map.

Further reading 
 Bernhardt, E. B. (Ed.) (1992). Life in language immersion classrooms. Clevedon, England: Multilingual Matters, Ltd.
 Genesee, F. (1985). Second language learning through immersion: A review of U.S. programs. Review of Educational Research, 55(4), 541–561.
 Genesee, F. (1987). Learning Through Two Languages: Studies of Immersion and Bilingual Education. Cambridge, Mass.: Newbury House Publishers.
 Hult, F.M., & King, K.A. (Eds.). (2011). Educational linguistics in practice: Applying the local globally and the global locally. Clevedon, UK: Multilingual Matters.
 Hult, F.M., (Ed.). (2010). Directions and prospects for educational linguistics. New York: Springer.
Lindholm-Leary, K. (2001). Theoretical and conceptual foundations for dual language education programs. In K. Lindholm-Leary, Dual language education (pp. 39–58). Clevedon, England: Multilingual Matters Ltd.
Mammadova, T. (2019). Teaching Grammar to a Grammar-Free Generation. Newcastle-upon-tyne: Cambridge Scholars  
 McKay, Sharon; Schaetzel, Kirsten, Facilitating Adult Learner Interactions to Build Listening and Speaking Skills, CAELA Network Briefs, CAELA and Center for Applied Linguistics
 Meunier, Fanny; Granger, Sylviane, "Phraseology in foreign language learning and teaching", Amsterdam and Philadelphia : John Benjamins Publishing Company, 2008
 Met, M., & Lorenz, E. (1997). Lessons from U.S. immersion programs: Two decades of experience. In R. Johnson & M. Swain (Eds.), Immersion education: International perspectives (pp. 243–264). Cambridge, UK: Cambridge University Press.
 Swain, M. & Johnson, R. K. (1997). Immersion education: A category within bilingual education. In R. K. Johnson & M. Swain (Eds.), Immersion education: International perspectives (pp. 1–16). NY: Cambridge University Press.
 Parker, J. L. (2020). Students' attitudes toward project-based learning in an intermediate Spanish course. International Journal of Curriculum and Instruction, 12(1), 80–97. http://ijci.wcci-international.org/index.php/IJCI/article/view/254/153

External links 

Language Academia
UCLA Language Materials Project
EF Education First
BBC Learning English

 
Applied linguistics